Grand Longwy Agglomération (before September 2021: Communauté d'agglomération de Longwy) is the communauté d'agglomération, an intercommunal structure, centred on the town of Longwy. It is located in the Meurthe-et-Moselle department, in the Grand Est region, northeastern France. Created in 1960, its seat is in Longwy. Its area is 173.5 km2. Its population was 62,433 in 2019, of which 14,774 in Longwy proper.

Composition
The communauté d'agglomération consists of the following 21 communes:

Chenières
Cons-la-Grandville
Cosnes-et-Romain
Cutry
Fillières
Gorcy
Haucourt-Moulaine
Herserange
Hussigny-Godbrange
Laix
Lexy
Longlaville
Longwy
Mexy
Mont-Saint-Martin
Morfontaine
Réhon
Saulnes
Tiercelet
Ugny
Villers-la-Montagne

References

Longwy
Longwy